Thomas Fillingham (6 September 1904 – 1 May 1960) was an English professional footballer who played as a centre half. He made 212 appearances in the Football League in the late 1920s and 1930s.

Born in Bulwell, Nottinghamshire, Fillingham worked at a colliery and a dyehouse and played local football in the Nottinghamshire area before turning professional with Birmingham, for whom he went on to play 183 games in the Football League First Division. He was a strong, versatile player; originally a forward, he converted to defence, becoming first choice at centre half as the replacement for George Morrall, but was always keen to push forward. He sustained an injury playing for Birmingham in 1934 which resulted in him losing an eye some 15 years later.

In 1938 Fillingham moved to Ipswich Town, and played in their first ever match in the Football League. He made guest appearances for clubs in the Nottinghamshire area during the Second World War, but did not play afterwards. He was also a good cricketer and golfer. He died in Bulwell in 1960 at the age of 55.

Honours
Birmingham
 FA Cup finalist: 1930–31

References

1904 births
1960 deaths
People from Bulwell
Footballers from Nottinghamshire
English footballers
Association football defenders
Birmingham City F.C. players
Ipswich Town F.C. players
English Football League players